Marcelo Rosa da Silva (born 29 January 1976) is a former Brazilian football player.

Club statistics

References

External links

Cerezo Osaka

1976 births
Living people
Brazilian footballers
Brazilian expatriate footballers
Campeonato Brasileiro Série A players
J1 League players
Expatriate footballers in Japan
Sport Club Internacional players
CR Flamengo footballers
Cerezo Osaka players
Servette FC players
Association football midfielders
Footballers from Porto Alegre